Edwin Lee Palmquist (June 10, 1933 – July 10, 2010) was a middle relief pitcher who played from 1960 through 1961 in Major League Baseball. A native of Los Angeles, he attended Susan Miller Dorsey High School. He signed with the Brooklyn Dodgers as a free agent in 1951.
 
Palmquist entered the majors in 1960 with the Los Angeles Dodgers, playing for them in 1960-1961 before joining the Minnesota Twins (1961). He posted a 1–3 record with a 5.11 earned run average in 36 pitching appearances, including two starts, allowing 47 runs (39 earned) on 77 hits while walking 36 batters and striking out 41 in 68 innings of work.

In 1963, Palmquist pitched in Japan for the Daimai Orions. He also saw action in the minor leagues with the Santa Barbara Dodgers (1951–52), Newport News Dodgers (1955), Kokomo Dodgers (1956), Great Falls Electrics (1957), Spokane Indians (1958, 1960), St. Paul Saints (1959) and Vancouver Mounties (1962), registering a mark of 28–36 with a 3.58 ERA in 551 innings.

Palmquist was a longtime resident of Grant's Pass, Oregon, where he died at the age of 77.

References

External links

Santa Maria Times – obituary

1933 births
2010 deaths
American expatriate baseball players in Japan
Baseball players from Los Angeles
Daimai Orions players
Great Falls Electrics players
Kokomo Dodgers players
Los Angeles Dodgers players
Major League Baseball pitchers
Minnesota Twins players
Newport News Dodgers players
Nippon Professional Baseball pitchers
St. Paul Saints (AA) players
Santa Barbara Dodgers players
Spokane Indians players
Sportspeople from Grants Pass, Oregon
Vancouver Mounties players
Susan Miller Dorsey High School alumni